Anthony Joseph Patrick Laffey (28 May 1925 – 18 September 2017) was an association football player who represented New Zealand at international level.

Laffey made a solitary official A-international appearance for New Zealand in a 5–1 win over New Caledonia on 7 September 1958.

In addition to his cap-earning appearance Laffey played nine other matches for New Zealand between 1955 and 1959 against touring club and regional representative sides.

Laffey was awarded Canterbury FA sportsman of the year award on two occasions. He died in Nelson on 18 September 2017.

References 

1925 births
2017 deaths
New Zealand association footballers
New Zealand international footballers
Association footballers from Christchurch
Association football defenders